Daryl Boyle (born February 24, 1987) is a Canadian-German professional ice hockey defenseman who is currently playing for EHC Red Bull München of the Deutsche Eishockey Liga (DEL).

Playing career 
A native of Sparwood, British Columbia, Boyle spent four years with the Brandon Wheat Kings of the WHL, serving as team captain in 2007–08. He then played in the American Hockey League, representing three different teams (Norfolk Admirals, Rockford IceHogs, Peoria Rivermen). During the 2010–11 season, he also spent some time with ECHL's Alaska Aces.

In 2011, Boyle signed his first contract in Germany with Augsburger Panther of the Deutsche Eishockey Liga (DEL). He spent three years with the club, serving as team captain in 2012–13 and 2013–14.

In March 2014, Boyle agreed to terms with fellow DEL outfit EHC München.

International play
Boyle has dual citizenship in Canada and Germany. He made his debut on the German national team during the 2013 Deutschland Cup. Boyle was a member of the silver medal winning German Olympic hockey team at the 2018 Winter Olympics in Pyeongchang, South Korea.

Career statistics

Regular season and playoffs

International

Awards and honours

References

External links

1987 births
Living people
Alaska Aces (ECHL) players
Augsburger Panther players
Brandon Wheat Kings players
Canadian ice hockey defencemen
Crowsnest Pass Timberwolves players
EHC München players
Norfolk Admirals players
Ice hockey players at the 2018 Winter Olympics
Medalists at the 2018 Winter Olympics
Olympic ice hockey players of Germany
Olympic medalists in ice hockey
Olympic silver medalists for Germany
Peoria Rivermen (AHL) players
Rockford IceHogs (AHL) players
Canadian expatriate ice hockey players in Germany
Canadian expatriate ice hockey players in the United States
Naturalized citizens of Germany
Canadian emigrants to Germany
Ice hockey people from British Columbia
People from Fernie, British Columbia